The Deal  is a 1983 Argentine drama film directed by Fernando Ayala and written by Roberto Cossa and Carlos Somigliana. The film premiered on 19 May 1983 in Buenos Aires. It was entered into the 13th Moscow International Film Festival where it won a Special Diploma.

Plot summary
Luis, a hard working and honest family man living in a small town, becomes involved in a moral quandary: Water service has come to his street, but only one side of the street. Due to a technical error, Luis and everyone on his side simply won't be getting the service. However, the water company foreman is open to bribes in order to provide water to the other side of the street. When Luis declines to bribe the man for his family, everyone on his side, neighbours and family included, turn against him, and the foreman resents him.

After some time, Luis relents and tries to bribe the foreman, but things go wrong when the foreman calls him a hypocrite and insults him. Luis backs down on a deal and the situation ends in a fight between the two of them. In the end, Luis' moral struggle proves him right, though it happens at a cost.

Cast
Federico Luppi   
Julio De Grazia   
Rodolfo Ranni   
Haydée Padilla   
Susú Pecoraro   
Dora Prince   
Margara Alonso   
Maria Visconti   
Mario Alarcón   
Manuel Callau   
Andrea Tenuta   
Emilio Vidal   
Pascual Pelliciota   
Mario Luciani   
Carlos Trigo

References

External links
 

Argentine thriller films
1983 films
1980s Spanish-language films
1983 thriller films
Spanish thriller films
Films directed by Fernando Ayala
1980s Argentine films